Ustad Ahmad Lahori was a Punjabi Muslim architect during the Mughal Empire, who is said to have been the chief architect of the Taj Mahal in Agra, built between 1632 and 1648 during the rule of the Emperor Shah Jahan. Its architecture is a combination of Indo-Islamic and Persian architectural styles, and thus a major example of Indo-Persian culture. It is widely praised around the world, enabling it to be listed among the Wonders of the World.

Life 
The nisba "Lahori" indicates that he came from Lahore, Punjab, in the Mughal Empire. He has been described as a Punjabi Muslim in different sources. Even after his family's migration to Delhi, his family is still referred to by the epithet "Lahori". In Muslim India, Lahori was used as a synonym for Punjabi by historic writers, such as Amir Khusro who uses it to refer to the spoken language of the people of Punjab, and the Mughal Emperor Jahangir who writes, "In fact they are pure Lahauris and speak the same language."

Shah Jahan's court histories emphasize his personal involvement in the construction and it is true that, more than any other Mughal emperor, he showed the greatest interest in building new magnificent buildings, holding daily meetings with his architects and supervisors. The court chronicler Lahori, writes that Shah Jahan would make "appropriate alterations to whatever the skillful architects had designed after considerable thought and would ask the architects competent questions."

In writings by Lahori's son, Lutfullah Muhandis, two architects are mentioned by name; Ustad Ahmad Lahori and Mir Abd-ul Karim. Ustad Ahmad Lahori had laid the foundations of the Red Fort at Delhi (built between 1638 and 1648). Mir Abd-ul Karim had been the favourite architect of the previous emperor Jahangir and is mentioned as a supervisor, together with Makramat Khan, for the construction of the Taj Mahal.

Lahori had three sons: Ataullah (or Ata Allah Rashidi), Luftullah (or Lutf Allah Muhandis) and Nur Allah (or Nur Allah), who were also involved in architecture besides other fields such as mathematics.

Gallery

See also
 Ustad Isa

References

Notes

Mughal architecture
Taj Mahal
Year of birth unknown
Year of death unknown
Mughal Empire people
People from Lahore
17th-century Indian architects